Forever Young is a 2015 Chinese coming-of-age film directed by He Jiong and starring Li Yifeng and Zhang Huiwen. The film was released on July 10, 2015.

Plot
Set in an arts performing college, the story revolves around Yan Xi and Xu Nuo, a couple who is envied by many in school. The two work hard to achieve their dreams — Xu Nuo wants to eventually get sign on with a music label with his band and Yan Xi wants to go to Paris for ballet school. However, when Yan Xi finds out that she wasn't accepted into the prestigious program, and that her friends had started making alternate plans, she breaks into a tantrum and starts to distance herself. Before she could make amends, her friends died in a car accident. Full of remorse, Yan Xi has a month to come up with a replacement for the Dance of the Cygnets that the four girls were going to perform at the university's Dream Night Graduation Party. However, before she could think of a solution, Yan Xi falls and injures her  leg.

Xu Nuo proposes to his friends that they perform the Dance of the Cygnets themselves. The start training in secret, without Yan Xi's knowledge, intending on giving her a surprise.

Cast
 Li Yifeng as Xu Nuo
 Zhang Huiwen as Yan Xi
 Jiang Jinfu
 Wei Daxun
 Calvin Tu
 Zhang Yuxi
 Li Xin'ai
 Song Yi
Zhang Yunlong
 Chai Ge as Ji Yan
 Wang Youshuo
 Coco Lee
Liu Haoran as Host
Nichkhun

Reception
The film received negative reviews in regard to its plot and acting.

Despite negative reviews, the film made US$38.5 million in its three-day opening weekend in China, debuting at first place at the Chinese box office and third worldwide behind Minions and Terminator Genisys.

References

External links
 

2015 films
2010s romantic musical films
Chinese romance films
Chinese musical films
2010s Mandarin-language films
Chinese coming-of-age films
2015 directorial debut films
Heyi Pictures films
Chinese teen films